The Stade Henri Sylvoz is a stadium primarily used for football matches in Moanda, Gabon. It is the home of the Gabonese team AS Mangasport. The stadium has capacity to 4,000 people.

Henri